This is a list of stations which were affiliated with The WB in the United States at the time of the network's closure. The WB shut down September 17, 2006. Former affiliates of The WB became affiliates of The CW, MyNetworkTV, another network, reverted to independent status, or shut down entirely.  Some WB affiliates dropped WB programming on September 5, 2006 in favor of MyNetworkTV.

From January 1995 to September 2006, Tribune Broadcasting was an investor in The WB, along with the Warner Bros. division of Time Warner. Tribune held an initial 12.5 percent stake in the network at its launch, and later increased it to 22 percent; most of Tribune's television properties were key WB affiliates but not owned-and-operated stations of the network as Time Warner had controlling interest in it. On January 24, 2006, Warner Bros. Television announced that they would merge The WB with the CBS-owned United Paramount Network to form a new programming service called the CW. All but three of Tribune's WB stations joined the CW on September 18, 2006, through ten-year agreements. Tribune does not have an ownership interest in the CW. In late March 2008 Tribune announced that San Diego affiliate KSWB-TV would switch its network affiliation to Fox in August of that year. The future status of the CW affiliation in San Diego remained unclear until early July when the network named the soon-to-be-displaced Fox affiliate, Tijuana-licensed XETV, as its new affiliate. Stations in bold are Tribune owned and operated stations.

Alabama
Birmingham WTTO1 21/WDBB 171
Dothan WBDO Cable 3/63
Huntsville/Decatur/Florence WAWB2 (no analog channel; broadcast only on digital subchannel of WZDX and on area cable systems)
Mobile WBPG1 55
Montgomery WBMY Cable 14

Alaska
Anchorage KWBX
Fairbanks KWBX
Juneau KWJA

Arizona
Phoenix KASW1 61
Tucson KWBA1 58
Yuma KWUB Cable 6

Arkansas
Fort Smith KBBL-TV2 34
Jonesboro KJOS Cable 60
Little Rock KWBF2 42

California
Bakersfield KWFB cable 12
Chico KIWB cable 10
Eureka KWBT
Los Angeles KTLA-TV1 5 
Monterey KMWB cable 14
Palm Springs KCWB
San Diego KSWB-TV1 69 (cable 5)
San Francisco-Oakland-San Jose KOFY-TV3 20
Sacramento-Stockton KQCA-TV2 58
Sanger-Fresno KFRE-TV1 59
Santa Barbara/Santa Maria/San Luis Obispo KWCA Cable 5

Colorado
Denver KWGN-TV1 2
Grand Junction KWGJ

Connecticut
Hartford-New Haven WTXX1 20

District of Columbia
Washington WDCW1 50

Florida
Ft. Myers - Naples WTVK1 46 (cable 6)
Gainesville WBFL cable 10
Jacksonville WCWJ1 17 (formerly WJWB 1997-2006)
Miami - Ft. Lauderdale WDZL/WBZL/WSFL1 39 
Orlando - WKCF1 18
Panama City WBPC
Tallahassee WFXU / WTLF1 57 / 24
Tampa Bay Area WWWB WB32 (now WMOR-TV1996-1998) WTTA2 WB38
West Palm Beach WTCN2 43

Georgia
Albany WBSK
Atlanta WATL2 36 
Augusta WBAU cable 23
Columbus WBG
Macon WBMN cable 3
Savannah WBVH cable 13

Hawaii
Honolulu KFVE2 5

Idaho
Boise KWOB1 Cable 13
Idaho Falls KPIF 15
Twin Falls KWTE

Illinois
Champaign-Urbana-Springfield WBUI1 23
Chicago WGN-TV1 9 (nationwide from 1995-1999)
Peoria WBPE
Quincy WEWB cable 6
Rockford WBR cable 14

Indiana
Bloomington (Indianapolis) WTTV1 4
Evansville (Madisonville, KY) WAZE-TV1 19
Fort Wayne WBFW1 37 (part of the WB 100+ station group)
Kokomo WTTK1 29 
South Bend WMWB-LP1 25
Terre Haute WBI cable 3

Iowa
Burlington/Quad Cities KGCW1 26
Des Moines KPWB1 23/KCWI1 56 (DT22 MyNetworkTV on 56.2)
Iowa City/Cedar Rapids KWKB-TV12 20
Ottumwa KWOT
Sioux City KXWB The WB 100+

Kansas
Topeka WBKS cable 5
Wichita KWCV1 33

Kentucky
Bowling Green WBWG1 cable 12
Campbellsville-Columbia-Louisville WBKI-TV1 34
Madisonville WAZE-TV1 19
Paducah WDKA2 49

Louisiana
Alexandria KBCA 41
Baton Rouge WBRL-CD1 21
Lafayette KLAF-LP 46 (shared with UPN, 1995-1999), KLWB (TV) 50 (2006)
Lake Charles WBLC
Monroe KWMB cable 12
Morgan City KWBJ 39 
New Orleans WNOL1 38 (originally a FOX affiliate until 1995)
Shreveport KSHV2 45, KPXJ 21 (Shared affiliation with UPN on KSHV from 1997-2003 & on KPXJ in September 2006)

Maine
Bangor WBAN1 cable 4
Portland-Auburn-Augusta WPXT1 51
Presque Isle WBPQ1 cable 13

Maryland
Baltimore WNUV1 54
Salisbury WBD cable 3

Massachusetts
Boston WLVI1 56
Springfield WBQT1 "WB 11"/"WB 16" (The WB 100+)

Michigan
Alpena WBAE-TV5 cable 21 (through The WB 100+ Station Group)
Battle Creek WZPX4 43 (secondary affiliation; Pax TV (now Ion Television) was primary affiliation)
Detroit WMYD2 20
Lansing WBL1 cable 30
Marquette WBMK
Saginaw WBSF1 46
Traverse City WBVC-TV1 cable 61 (through The WB 100+ Station Group)

Minnesota
Duluth KWBD Cable 2
Mankato KWYE Cable 23
Minneapolis-St. Paul WUCW1 23
Rochester KWBR Cable 18

Mississippi
Biloxi WBGP
Columbus WBWP
Greenwood WBWD
Hattiesburg WBH Comcast Cable 59
Jackson WUFX2 35
Meridian WBMM

Missouri
Columbia-Jefferson City KJWB Cable 5
Joplin-Pittsburg KSXF
Kansas City KSMO-TV2 62
St. Joseph WBJO
St. Louis KPLR-TV1 11 
Springfield KWBM2 31

Montana
Billings KWBM
Butte KWXB
Glendive KWZB
Great Falls KWGF
Helena KMTF 10
Missoula KIDW

Nebraska
Lincoln-Hastings-Kearney KWBL (The WB 100+)
North Platte KWPL
Omaha KXVO-TV1 15

Nevada
Las Vegas KVMY2 21
Reno KREN-TV 27

New Hampshire
There were none in this state, but the WB was offered from WLVI Boston, WPXT Portland, and WFFF-TV Burlington-Plattsburgh.

New Mexico
Albuquerque KWBQ1 19

New York
Albany-Schenectady-Troy WCWN1 45 (formerly WEWB-TV 1999-2006; now owned by Sinclair Broadcast Group)
Binghamton WBXI1 cable 11
Buffalo WNYO2 49
Elmira/Corning WBE1 cable 2
New York WPIX-TV1 11
Rochester WRWB1 cable 16 (formerly owned by Time Warner Cable; now owned by Deerfield Media and operated by Sinclair Broadcast Group)
Syracuse WNYS-TV2 43
Utica WBU1 cable 11
Watertown WBWT1 cable 14/22

North Carolina
Charlotte WMYT-TV2 55 (formerly WWWB 2001-2006)
Greenville-New Bern-Washington WGWB-TV5 The WB 100+
Lexington-Greensboro-High Point-Winston-Salem WCWG1 20 (formerly WTWB-TV 2000-2006)
Raleigh-Durham-Fayetteville WLFL-TV1 22
Wilmington WBW1 cable 29

North Dakota
Fargo/Grand Forks WBFG1 Cable 8
Bismarck KWMK1 Cable 14

Ohio
Cincinnati WSTR-TV2 64
Cleveland WBNX1 55
Columbus WWHO1 53 (shared affiliation with UPN)
Dayton WBDT-TV1 26
Lima WBOH cable 3
Toledo WT051 Cable 5 
Youngstown WBCB1 Digital/Cable (WFMJ 21.2)
Zanesville WBZV

Oklahoma
Oklahoma City KOCB1 34
Tulsa KQCW1 19 (formerly KWBT 1999-2006)

Oregon
Bend KWBO1 Cable 14
Eugene-Springfield KZWB1 Cable 11
Medford KMFD
Portland-Salem-Vancouver, WA KRCW-TV1 32 (formerly KWBP 1995-2006)

Pennsylvania
Erie WBEP 3
Philadelphia WPHL-TV2 17 
Pittsburgh WCWB (now WPNT2) 22
Scranton-Wilkes-Barre-Hazleton WSWB1 38 (shared affiliation with UPN)
Williamsport WQMY2 53 (formerly WILF, a repeater of WSWB)

Rhode Island
Providence WLWC1 28 (shared affiliation with UPN)

South Carolina
Charleston WBLN5 26/Cable 14
Elgin-Columbia WKTC2 63/Cable 4
Florence-Myrtle Beach WFWB5
Greenville-Spartanburg-Anderson-Asheville, NC WMYA-TV2 40

South Dakota
Sioux Falls KWSD1 36
Rapid City KWBH-LP1 27

Tennessee
Chattanooga WFLI-TV1 53
Jackson WBJK
Knoxville WBXX-TV1 20
Memphis WLMT1 30
Nashville WNAB1 58
Tri-Cities WCYB-TV DT21 5.2 (cable "WB4")

Texas
Abilene KWAW
Amarillo KDBA cable 11
Austin KNVA12 54
Beaumont/Port Arthur KWJB (cable WB10)
Corpus Christi KWDB cable 16/23
Dallas/Ft. Worth KDAF1 33 
Harlingen/Weslaco/Brownsville/McAllen KMHB Cable 53 (formerly KHWB 1998-2003)
Houston KHTV/KHWB/KHCW1 39 
Laredo KTXW cable 19
Lubbock KWBZ 22
Odessa/Midland KWWT1 30 "WB30"
San Angelo KWSA cable 14
San Antonio/Kerrville KMYS2 35 (now a CW affiliate)
Sherman KSHD
Tyler/Longview KWTL (as part of The WB 100+)
Victoria KWVB
Waco KWKT2 44 (dual Fox/WB affiliate) (now Fox/MNTV affiliate)
Wichita Falls KWB

Utah
Salt Lake City KUCW1 30

Vermont
Burlington W39AS/WWIN/WBVT 39 (1995-1999)WFFF-TV4 44 (1999-2006) (shared affiliation with FOX)

Virginia
Bristol-Kingsport, TN-Johnson City, TN WCYB-DT21 5.2 
Charlottesville WBC
Harrisonburg WBHA
Norfolk-Portsmouth-Newport News-Hampton-Virginia Beach WTVZ2 33
Richmond WWBT4 12 (primary affiliation is with NBC)
Roanoke-Lynchburg WFXR DT21 21.2/WWCW DT2 20.2 (formerly cable "WB 5 (WBVA-TV)", digital subchannel of former WJPR)

Washington
Seattle-Tacoma-Olympia KTZZ/KTWB-TV/KMYQ/KZJO2 22 
Spokane KSKN-TV1 22
Yakima-Pasco-Richland-Kennewick KWYP

West Virginia
Bluefield-Beckley WBB1 The WB 100+
Charleston-Huntington-Portsmouth, Ohio WQCW1 30/WOCW-LP 21/WVCW-LP 45 (shared affiliation with UPN) (formerly WHCP/WOWB/WBWV 1995-2006)
Clarksburg WVWB
Parkersburg WBPB
Wheeling WBWO 18 (cable)

Wisconsin
Green Bay WCWF1 14
La Crosse WBCZ cable 15
Madison WBUW1 57
Milwaukee WVTV1 18
Wausau WBWA cable 15

Wyoming
Casper KWWY
Cheyenne KCHW

Notes
Key:
1 = affiliate that joined The CW Television Network
2 = affiliate that joined MyNetworkTV
3 = affiliate that became an independent station
4 = affiliate that dropped secondary WB affiliation
5 = affiliate status uncertain
Key affiliates of The WB that were owned by Tribune Broadcasting during their time as a WB affiliate are denoted in bold.

See also
The WB
The WB 100+ Station Group

WB affiliates
WB
The WB